Kaldnes Mekaniske Verksted was a Norwegian manufacturing company, which it best known for its shipyard.

It was founded in 1899, and was engaged in shipbuilding until 1992. It continued as a truck manufacturer until 2001. The former shipyard district at Kaldnes in Tønsberg was then built up with waterfront housing from 2002.

References

Manufacturing companies of Norway
Shipyards of Norway
Companies based in Tønsberg
Vehicle manufacturing companies established in 1899
1899 establishments in Norway
Vehicle manufacturing companies disestablished in 2001
2001 disestablishments in Norway